Judith-Lee Alice Green, OAM (born 7 February 1967) is an Australian Paralympic swimmer.  She won a gold medal at the 2000 Sydney Games in the Women's 100 m Breaststroke SB6 event, for which she received a Medal of the Order of Australia.

References

Female Paralympic swimmers of Australia
Swimmers at the 2000 Summer Paralympics
Paralympic gold medalists for Australia
Recipients of the Medal of the Order of Australia
1967 births
Living people
Medalists at the 2000 Summer Paralympics
Paralympic medalists in swimming
Australian female breaststroke swimmers
S7-classified Paralympic swimmers